Aakhri Baazi is a 1989 Indian drama crime film directed by Ashim S. Samanta and starring Govinda, Shatrughan Sinha, Moushumi Chatterjee, Mandakini and Sonam.

Plot
Ram Kumar lives a wealthy lifestyle in Calcutta with his brother, Prashant, and Parvati, his sister-in-law. Since his school-days he had befriended a young orphan named Laxman, who also lives with them. Years later, Ram and Laxman have grown up, and Laxman joins the Police Force. Impressed with Laxman's dedication and diligence, the Police Commissioner assigns him to take down the crime empire of a notorious underworld don called Cobra. Laxman is killed trying to arrest Cobra, and Ram swears to avenge Laxman's death, and sets forth to seek Cobra. It is then Ram finds out that the man called Cobra may be Prashant himself. A series of double crosses and deceit leads to a plot much more sinister than what Ram could have ever imagined. Is Prashant the real culprit or a victim of mistaken identity? How will Ram annihilate Cobra and his crime empire?

Cast
Govinda as Ram Kumar
Pradeep Kumar as Cobra 
Shatrughan Sinha as Prashant Kumar / P.K
Moushumi Chatterjee as Parvati P. Kumar 
Mandakini as Rita 
Sonam as Sapna  
Sadashiv Amrapurkar as Shakaal 
Kunal Goswami as Inspector Laxman 
Mac Mohan as Mac
Sujit Kumar as Police Commissioner
Manik Irani as Jagawar

Soundtrack

References

External links
 

1980s Hindi-language films
1989 films
Films scored by Anu Malik
Films directed by Ashim Samanta
Indian action drama films